Mareel is a multi-purpose entertainment venue located on the waterfront of Lerwick, the capital of Shetland. Opening in 2012, the facility includes a music venue, cinema, conference rooms and educational facilities.

Facilities
Mareel is designed as a multi use venue and hub for the creative industries. The site is near the new Shetland Museum and Archives in Lerwick. Shetland Arts are the lead agency behind the project, Gareth Hoskins were the architects and D.I.T.T. the building contractors. The name means "phosphorescence on the ocean".

The main performance auditorium has a standing capacity of about 650 and a seated capacity of around 250, with a balcony seating a further 85 people. There are 2 screening areas. The main cinema has a seated capacity of around 160 with a smaller second cinema seating around 40.

The recording studio has a control room and live area. The split level cafe bar incorporates additional performance areas. The rehearsal area(s) have sprung floors making them suitable for music and dance use. The multi media production suite has facilities for film, TV, music, graphics and website production.

Shetland College UHI began delivering music courses in Mareel in the 2012/13 academic year.

History
Timeline of key dates in the project's history

Finance

Mareel has attracted finance from sources including
 £5,190,000 - Shetland Islands Council
 £2,800,000 - European Regional Development Fund
 £2,120,000 - Scottish Arts Council lottery fund
 £965,000 - Highlands and Islands Enterprise
 £965,000 - Shetland Development Trust
 £50,000 - Gannochy Trust

Controversy
Opinions on Mareel are split amongst many in Shetland

Motivations for building Mareel include the development of the music, film and creative industries, tourism, educational opportunities, job creation and the provision of leisure and education facilities for the community, particularly young people.

Some local businesses, particularly Lerwick pub and night club owners via the Shetland Licensed Trade Association, claimed that Mareel would negatively affect their profits and an anonymous State Aid complaint was submitted to the European Commission on 17 July 2008. Shetland Arts countered these claims by providing evidence that Mareel would "generate activity and vitality into the night-time economy of Lerwick, to the benefit of all including the local hoteliers, publicans and restaurants". The State Aid complaint was not upheld.

Another source of concern was Mareel's business plan which detractors claim is unrealistic, particularly in terms of revenue raised from sales at the cafe bar. However, the business plan has been reviewed and approved by funders. Highlands and Islands Enterprise commissioned an Economic Impact Study which highlighted outcomes including the creation of 52 jobs and a positive impact on population retention of young people - an HIE Youth Migration Study identified the "creative industries as one of the most important sectors in encouraging young people to stay in or return to Shetland."

Some detractors have claimed that the capital funds allocated to Mareel would have better been spent on other projects, such as to avert the closure of rural schools, apparently under the misapprehension that the funders' capital could have been diverted to bail out the Shetland Islands Council Education revenue budget which had been overspent for many years.

Shetland Islands Council support
In 2008 the Shetland Islands Council voted to review their support for Mareel even though they had agreed their support on number of previous occasions and had "already spent around £750,000 on Mareel and previously committed itself to spending a further £4.5m from its capital programme.". The council voted 15:7 to commission a business plan review and re-vote six weeks later.

The Shetland Islands Council's finance officials reported the business plan to be "robust" and "well researched", but that costings estimates were "light" and audience and income targets "challenging".

The result of the subsequent vote on Wednesday 25 June was in favour of continuing support for Mareel. Due to a 9:9 split convener Sandy Cluness used his casting vote and is reported to have said "As far as I am concerned you can go ahead and build Mareel" as he delivered his decision, to "cheers of delight and lengthy applause from the 40 or so supporters" who were present in the council chambers.

Despite the vote "a few councillors (were) apparently unable to accept the democratic decision." West Mainland councillor Gary Robinson called into question the convener's handling of the vote stating "I think Sandy (the convenor) has won a battle, but the war isn’t over yet" and that he and other opponents (including Alison Duncan who had 6 weeks previously expressed his desire to "place a bomb" under Mareel and Jonathan Wills, a one time supporter of Mareel) would be considering their options in the coming weeks. This group continue to voice their opposition

Councillor Alan Wishart, who had voted against Mareel, reflected the majority view that the vote had been handled "properly and fairly" stating it had been "pretty intense, but a reasoned debate and I’m content with that... It was very reasonable on both sides and democracy had its say."

Music industry
Most of Lerwick's music venues and clubs closed during the 1990s and 2000s including the North Star, LK Sound Factory (Jubilee), Somewhaur Else, Ferry Inn (converted to Beltrami's but no longer featuring live music), Mooney's Wake and Baroc, and Mareel is seen by many as a positive development for the local live music scene.

Mareel's recording facilities are also considered to be an important development for the local industry, for both commercial and educational uses.

Public art

Artists Nayan Kulkarni and Roxane Permar were commissioned by Shetland Arts Development Agency to create public art for the building using the medium of light. They conceived the project, Mirrie Dancers, which involved members of the community and Shetland Lace knitters in the process of making work which will become part of the permanent installation at Mareel.

References

Shetland music
Buildings and structures in Shetland
Lerwick
2012 establishments in Scotland